Vernon is an unincorporated community in Jasper County, Mississippi, United States. Vernon is located on Tallahoma Creek. A post office operated under the name Vernon from 1893 to 1907.

References

Unincorporated communities in Jasper County, Mississippi
Unincorporated communities in Mississippi